Semperdon kororensis is a species of small, air-breathing land snails, terrestrial pulmonate gastropod molluscs in the family Charopidae. This species is endemic to Palau.

References

Fauna of Palau
Semperdon
Gastropods described in 1889
Taxonomy articles created by Polbot